The Roman Catholic Archdiocese of Birmingham is one of the principal Latin-rite Catholic administrative divisions of England and Wales in the hierarchy of the Roman Catholic Church. The metropolitan see is in the City of Birmingham at the Metropolitan Cathedral Church of Saint Chad. The metropolitan province includes the suffragan dioceses of Clifton and Shrewsbury.

The Archbishop is Bernard Longley, who was named the ninth Archbishop of Birmingham on 1 October 2009. He succeeds the Archbishop of Westminster, Cardinal Vincent Nichols (2000–09). Bishop Longley was installed as Archbishop of Birmingham at the Metropolitan Cathedral and Basilica of Saint Chad on 8 December 2009, the Solemnity of the Immaculate Conception and one of the patronal feasts of the Archdiocese, St Chad being the other.

History

Erected as the Vicariate Apostolic of the Midlands District in 1688, the vicariate grew very slowly until the advent of the industrial revolution.  In response to large growth the name was changed in 1840 to the Vicariate Apostolic of Central District and a new vicariate created out of the eastern district.

Finally, in September 1850, the vicariate was elevated to a full diocese, as the Diocese of Birmingham, along with the Diocese of Nottingham and the Diocese of Shrewsbury.  The diocese was then suffragan to the Archdiocese of Westminster.

The Diocese of Birmingham was elevated to archdiocesan status on 28 October 1911.

Diocesan boundaries

The Archbishop of Birmingham, the Most Reverend Bernard Longley, has overall episcopal oversight of the diocese that is divided into three pastoral areas, each of which is headed by an auxiliary bishop and contains a number of deaneries:

Central and Western Pastoral Area (Area Bishop: The Right Reverend David Evans): Birmingham Cathedral, Birmingham East, Birmingham North, Birmingham South, Kidderminster, Worcester.
Northern Pastoral Area (Area Bishop: The Right Reverend Stephen Wright): Dudley, Lichfield, North Staffordshire, Stafford, Walsall, Wolverhampton.
Southern Pastoral Area (Area Bishop: vacant - covered by the Very Reverend Canon Paul Fitzpatrick VE): Banbury, Coventry, Oxford North, Oxford South, Rugby, Warwick.

Bishops

Ordinaries

Vicars Apostolic of the Midland District
 Bonaventure Giffard (1687-1703), appointed Vicar Apostolic of the London District
 George Witham (1702-1716), appointed Vicar Apostolic of the Northern District
 John Talbot Stonor (1716-1756)
 John Joseph Hornyold (1756-1778)
 Thomas Joseph Talbot (1778-1795)
 Charles Berington (1795-1798)
 Gregory Stapleton (1800-1802)
 John Milner (1803-1826)
 Thomas Walsh (1826-1840), became Vicar Apostolic of the Central District (see below)

Vicars Apostolic of the Central District
 Thomas Walsh (1840-1848), see above; appointed Vicar Apostolic of the London District
 William Bernard Ullathorne, O.S.B. (1848-1850); see below

Bishops of Birmingham
 William Bernard Ullathorne, O.S.B. (1850-1888); see above
 Edward Ilsley (1888-1911); see below

Archbishops of Birmingham
 Edward Ilsley (1911-1921); see above
 John McIntyre (1921-1928)
 Thomas Leighton Williams (1929-1946)
 Joseph Masterson (1947-1953)
 Francis Joseph Grimshaw (1954-1965)
 George Patrick Dwyer (1965-1981)
 Maurice Noël Léon Couve de Murville (1982-1999)
 Vincent Gerard Nichols (2000-2009), appointed Archbishop of Westminster (Cardinal in 2014)
 Bernard Longley (2009–present)

Coadjutor Vicars Apostolic
John Joseph Hornyold (1751-1756)
Thomas Joseph Talbot (1766-1778)
Charles Berington (1786-1795)
 Thomas Walsh (1825-1826)
 Nicholas Wiseman (1840-1847), appointed Coadjutor Vicar Apostolic of the London District, later Vicar Apostolic of the London District and Archbishop of Westminster (elevated to Cardinal in 1850)

Auxiliary bishops

John Patrick Barrett (1926-1929), appointed Bishop of Plymouth
Terence John Brain (1991-1997), appointed Bishop of Salford
Humphrey Penderell Bright (1944-1964)
Robert John Byrne, C.O. (2014-2019), appointed Bishop of Hexham and Newcastle
Joseph Francis Cleary (1964-1987)
Anthony Joseph Emery (1967-1976), appointed Bishop of Portsmouth
Michael Francis Glancey (1924-1925)
Bernard William Griffin (1938-1943), appointed Archbishop of Westminster (Cardinal in 1946)
Roger Francis Crispian Hollis (1987-1988), appointed Bishop of Portsmouth
Edward Ilsley (1879-1888), appointed Bishop here
Leonard William Kenney, C.P. (2006-2021)
Patrick Leo McCartie (1977-1990), appointed Bishop of Northampton
David Christopher McGough (2005-2020)
John McIntyre (1912-1917), appointed official of the Roman Curia and titular archbishop; later returned here as Archbishop
Philip Pargeter (1989-2009)
Stephen James Lawrence Wright (2020-)
David Ernest Charles Evans (2020-)

Other priests of this diocese who became bishops
Francis Kerril Amherst, appointed Bishop of Northampton in 1858
James Brown, appointed Bishop of Shrewsbury in 1851
David John Cashman, appointed auxiliary bishop of Westminster in 1958
Kieran Thomas Conry, appointed Bishop of Arundel and Brighton in 2001
James Dey, appointed Vicar Apostolic of Great Britain, Military in 1935
Edward Dicconson, appointed Vicar Apostolic of Northern District in 1740
Kevin John Dunn, appointed Bishop of Hexham and Newcastle in 2004
Joseph Gray, appointed auxiliary bishop of Liverpool in 1968
Frederick William Keating, appointed Bishop of Northampton in 1908
Edmund James Knight, appointed auxiliary bishop of Shrewsbury in 1879
Kevin John Patrick McDonald, appointed Bishop of Northampton in 2001
Patrick Joseph McKinney, appointed Bishop of Nottingham in 2015
Francis George Mostyn, appointed Vicar Apostolic of Northern District in 1840
David James Oakley, appointed Bishop of Northampton in 2020
Richard Butler Roskell, appointed Bishop of Nottingham in 1853
Marcus Nigel Stock, appointed Bishop of Leeds in 2014
Francis Gerard Thomas, appointed Bishop of Northampton in 1982
William Wareing, appointed Vicar Apostolic of Eastern District in 1840
Henry Weedall, appointed Vicar Apostolic of Northern District in 1840; did not take effect

Education 
Holy Trinity Catholic Academy of Stafford and Stone

See also 
Archbishop of Birmingham
List of Roman Catholic dioceses in England and Wales
 Newman University
 St Mary's College, Oscott
 Maryvale Institute
 Harvington Hall
 St Mary's Abbey, Colwich
 St Mary's Convent, Handsworth
 Carmelite Monastery, Wolverhampton

References

External links
Archdioceses of Birmingham website
GCatholic.org information
Catholic Hierarchy
Ardiocese of Birmingham Directory 2020 (CPMM Media Group, Liverpool, 2019)

 
Christianity in Birmingham, West Midlands
Religious organizations established in 1688
Pope Pius IX
Roman Catholic dioceses and prelatures established in the 17th century
1688 establishments in England